Zema Williams (July 7, 1941 – July 19, 2016), better known as Chief Zee, was a well-known fan and unofficial mascot of the franchise then-known as the Washington Redskins (since renamed Washington Commanders) of the National Football League.  Dressed in a faux Native American war bonnet, rimmed glasses, and red jacket, Chief Zee began attending Redskins games in 1978.

History
Born in Colquitt, Georgia on July 7, 1941, Williams worked as a sharecropper and picked cotton as a youth. He later drove a truck, when he got a draft notice in 1960. Two years later, he completed his military service at Fort Riley, and returned to driving trucks. By 1968, he was a car salesman in Washington, D.C.

Williams first showed up in costume at RFK Stadium on September 10, 1978. In 1983, Chief Zee attended a game against the Eagles at Veterans Stadium. Following their team's 10-point loss to the Redskins, he was attacked, suffering a broken arm, leg and ribs as well as a torn original costume, leaving him hospitalized. He returned the next year to Philadelphia but after a woman threw a beer in his face, it was his last time.

On August 9, 2008, Williams set down his signature prop, a toy tomahawk, while he was signing autographs at the Redskins' preseason game against the Buffalo Bills.  When he turned to retrieve it, it was gone.  The 12-inch tomahawk has a slender wooden handle with a rubber blade, and appears in many photos of Williams since he started attending Redskins games over 30 years prior.  
By August 28, 2008, Chief Zee's tomahawk has been returned to him with the help of Redskins tight end Chris Cooley who got a call from someone that said they had it.  He swapped a signed jersey for the tomahawk.

In his later years, Williams lived on Social Security and had difficulty walking. Dan Snyder, the owner of the Redskins, purchased the scooter that he used. Williams also faced eviction due to not being able to keep up with his rent, but several fans used a GoFundMe campaign to raise enough to pay both back rent and enough ahead that the situation would not arise again.

Williams died in his sleep on July 19, 2016.

Honors
November 7, 1985, was declared "Chief Zee Day" in Washington, D.C.
In 2000, Visa and the Pro Football Hall of Fame selected the biggest fan of each of the then-31 teams and placed them in an exhibit in Canton.  He was the fan chosen for the Washington Redskins.

Controversy
Some consider Williams' portrayal of American Indians to have been offensive.  His use of a stylized headdress was often referenced as the reason for offense, as the headdress is a sacred, central cultural item for many tribes.

See also
The Barrel Man
Crazy Ray
Fireman Ed
Hogettes
License Plate Guy

References

1941 births
2016 deaths
Washington Redskins
Spectators of American football
National Football League mascots
People from Colquitt, Georgia
People from Washington, D.C.